British Railways Class 505 were 1,500 V DC electric multiple units (EMUs) introduced in 1931 by the Manchester, South Junction and Altrincham Railway (MSJAR).  Although assigned to TOPS Class 505 by British Railways, these units were withdrawn before the TOPS numbering system came into common use for multiple units, and the Class 505 designation is very rarely used.

Following the 1923 Grouping, the MSJAR company was owned jointly by the LMS and LNER.  It operated a  route between Manchester London Road (now Manchester Piccadilly) and Altrincham in Cheshire. The MSJAR was electrified in the early 1930s on the  1,500 V DC overhead system.

Overview
Twenty-two 3-car EMUs and two spare power cars were built for the new electric service, which started on 11 May 1931. It was common with the earlier generation electric trains for the power cars to require much more engineering workshop time than the trailers, and several systems had additional power cars built. These trains were based at Bowdon depot and ran exclusively between Manchester and Altrincham for forty years. In 1939, eight additional trailers were added, both new build and secondhand conversions, inserted into eight of the 3-car sets, and these allowed 7-car trains to be run on many peak hour services. The Altrincham electrics had substantial power installed and were well able to handle the extra car. As with other Manchester area suburban electric services, demand reduced notably from the 1950s onwards, and the 7-car trains were eliminated.

Route shortened
The 1931 service ran from Altrincham, through Manchester Oxford Road, to Manchester London Road (nowadays Manchester Piccadilly).  In 1961 it was decided to extend the 25 kV electrification project from Crewe to Manchester Piccadilly through to Oxford Road station, and thus the Altrincham electric trains had to be cut back to that point, where new terminal platforms for them were provided in a rebuilt station. The long term intention was to link the two routes as a through service, but this did not happen for another 10 years.

Withdrawal and preservation
Two centre trailer cars, M29666 and M29670 (MSJAR 117 and 121), were purchased by the Altrincham Electric Railway Preservation Society and moved to the Yorkshire Dales Railway (now Embsay and Bolton Abbey Steam Railway). In 1983, they were moved to the Midland Railway Centre (now Midland Railway - Butterley) in Derbyshire where they are undergoing restoration. Here they joined centre trailer coach M29663 (MSJAR 114) which had been bought by Derby City Council. This coach was broken up in 2006. No driving coaches have been preserved.

Description
The Altrincham Electrics were built with a wooden frame construction and individual compartments, with no corridors or gangways. They were coupled as 3-car sets and often operated in multiple as 6-car trains at rush hours. The units were built by Metropolitan Cammell to an LMS design and were a much more conservative style of train than the Southport and Wirral line EMUs which the LMS introduced just a few years later.

Formation
Each three-car Altrincham Electric comprised:-
A motor coach, with driving cab, guard's compartment, electrical equipment and third class passenger compartments.  This coach was powered by four 328 hp. GEC traction motors and also carried the unit's pantograph.
A centre trailer coach, with no driving cab. The centre car had a number of first class compartments, in addition to third class accommodation.
A driving trailer coach, with third class compartments.

The third class compartments were later re-classified as second class by British Railways in 1956.

Specification

References

 Rowse, Jonathan Remembering the Altrincham Electrics TRACTION 32–35 May 2006

External links
 Altrincham Electric Railway Preservation Society

505
Train-related introductions in 1931
1500 V DC multiple units